Saint Mary Magdalene (French - Sainte Marie-Madeleine) Penitent Magdalene (Madeleine pénitente) or The Beautiful German Woman (La Belle Allemande) is a painted wooden sculpture of Mary Magdalene by Gregor Erhart (died 1540) of the Ulm School. Probably originally intended for the church dedicated to the saint in the Dominican monastery in Augsburg, it later became part of Siegfried Lämmle's collection. The Louvre used art of a legacy from Émile Louis Sévène (née Laure Eugénie Declerck) to acquire it in 1902 and it was returned to the Louvre after being taken to Germany during the Nazi Occupation on the orders of Hermann Goering.

Sources
https://collections.louvre.fr/en/ark:/53355/cl010093565

15th-century sculptures
16th-century sculptures
German sculpture
Nude sculptures in France
Sculptures of the Louvre by Flemish, Dutch and German artists
Sculptures of women in France
Louvre
Wooden sculptures